Zhangpeishanite was named for Zhang Peishan (Chinese: 张培善) mineralogist due to his contributions to Bayan Obo, where the mineral is a type locality. The Bayan Obo deposit is also known for being a world class deposit. The mineral got approved by the IMA in 2006 but was published two years after its approval.

Properties 
Some of the datas collected about zhangpeishanite were carried out on a synthetic equivalent of the mineral, such as cleavage and refractive index, due to zhangpeishanite's minute grain size. The mineral is isostructural with matlockite. It is a member of the matlockite group, and it is the barium dominant analogue of rorisite and matlockite. It is associated with barite, hematite, norsethite and fluorite. The inclusions form as bands within fluorite. The mineral occurs in fluorite as inclusions, up to 100 μm. However, they are typically much smaller, about 50 μm. It consists of barium mostly (71.21%), chlorine (18.94%) and fluorine (9.85%). Singular crystals can be obtained at 1500 K by solid-state reaction between BaF2 and BaCl2.

References

Barium minerals
Chlorides
Fluorides
Tetragonal minerals